The José Saramago Literary Prize has been awarded since 1999 by the Círculo de Leitores Foundation to a literary work written in Portuguese by a young author in which the first edition was published in a Lusophone country. It celebrates the attribution of the Nobel Prize in Literature in 1998 to the Portuguese writer José Saramago. The jury is composed of between five and ten members holding distinguished cultural roles.

Laureates

References

External links
Regulamento 

Portuguese-language literary awards
Portuguese literary awards
Awards established in 1998
Biennial events
José Saramago